The 416th Flight Test Squadron is a United States Air Force squadron. It is assigned to the 412th Operations Group, Air Force Materiel Command, stationed at Edwards Air Force Base, California.

During World War II, the 416th Bombardment Squadron was a Boeing B-17 Flying Fortress squadron, assigned to the 99th Bombardment Group of Fifteenth Air Force. It earned two Distinguished Unit Citations for its performance in combat.

Mission
The 416th performs flight testing on General Dynamics F-16 Fighting Falcon aircraft.

History

World War II
The 416th was established in early 1942 as a Boeing B-17 Flying Fortress reconnaissance squadron but was redesignated as a heavy bomb squadron before activation in June. It trained under II Bomber Command in the Pacific Northwest, being deployed with B-17Es directly to the XII Bomber Command in North Africa shortly after the Operation Torch landings in March 1943. In Algeria, the squadron engaged in combat operations in support of American ground forces in Algeria and Tunisia during the 1943 North African campaign.

In June 1943, the 416th helped force the capitulation of Pantelleria Island. It bombed in preparation for and in support of the invasions of Sicily and southern Italy in the summer and fall of 1943. In October 1943 the 416th was reassigned to the new Mediterranean Theater of Operations Fifteenth Air Force. Until the German capitulation in May 1945, the unit engaged in strategic bombardment of enemy targets in Italy, France, Germany, Czechoslovakia, Austria, Hungary, Romania, Bulgaria, Yugoslavia, and Greece, attacking oil refineries, marshaling yards, aircraft factories, and other strategic objectives.

After V-E Day, it was assigned to Air Transport Command Green Project, which was the movement of troops from Italy to staging areas in French Morocco. B-17s were dearmed with flooring and seats for 25 passengers installed. Each crew consisted of pilot, copilot, navigator and flight engineer. The 416th carried passengers from Tortorella and later from Marcianise Airfields to Port Lyautey Airfield, French Morocco, where transports moved them across the Atlantic or to Dakar for movement via the South Atlantic Transport Route.

The squadron was demobilized in Italy in late 1945, and inactivated in November.

Reserves
The unit was activated in the reserves in 1947 and possibly assigned some B-29 Superfortresses; however, it was never fully equipped or manned, and was inactivated in 1949 due to budget restraints.

F-16 flight testing

The squadron was reactivated for flight testing of the General Dynamics F-16 Fighting Falcon in 1989, after an inactivity of 43 years. The unit inherited the role of the 6516th TS that was also based at Edwards AFB. As the 6516th, the 416th was tasked with testing different weapon systems and specialized equipment on the F-16 in different production versions (blocks).

Weapons testing forms only a small part of the unit's task. Most weapons testing is conducted together with the Eglin AFB based testing squadrons. Some F-16s are painted in a regular gray USAF scheme for weapons testing, but other color schemes are used, such as white aircraft with red tails and ventral fins. These aircraft are often used as chase planes for other aircraft test programs.

A variety of 416th F-16s are used to chase F-22s and F-35s. These aircraft are also relocated to other airbases all over the country, mostly going to Eglin AFB for testing assistance or to Fort Worth JRB for assistance to the Lockheed F-35 program.
In the 1990s the 416th helped in the development of the MLU upgrade package for older (mainly European NATO countries') F-16A/B models. The USAF eventually didn't get involved in the production process but did provide test aircraft #80-584 for this purpose. It is still flying with the squadron to test further enhancement packages for both MLU Vipers as for the USAF CCIP program

In the 1990s the 416th led the flight test effort in the development of the AN/ASQ-213 HARM Targeting System.  The performance of this interim solution was instrumental in the retirement of the F-4G Wild Weasel aircraft in the mid 1990s.  The Air Force planned to replace the F-4G but the program was cancelled and the AN/ASQ-213 remains the primary F-16 SEAD mission sensor for the HARM missile more than 25 years later.

The unit briefly gained the McDonnell Douglas F-15 Eagle test mission (2004-2005). The F-15 fleet was sent to Eglin Air Force Base when the F-35 Joint Strike Fighters arrived in 2006.

During early 2009, the squadron deployed to Nellis Air Force Base, Nevada and participated in a Red Flag exercise. This was the first of this type of deployment for any Air Force Materiel Command unit. Red Flag 09-2 ran from 26 January to 6 February 2009. The reason for the deployment was to perform operational testing for the latest operating system M5.1+ software which is specific for the F-16. The squadron took five aircraft all equipped with this latest software and flew 54 sorties.

Redesignated: 416th Flight Test Squadron on 1 March 1994

Another deployment was organized for 23 January to 4 February 2012, to test software for the 6.1+ operating system. The new software allows several improvements, such as ability to carry the Small Diameter Bomb. This will allow the F-16 to carry more weapons and deliver this munition from farther away. Although primary deployed to test, the 416th was also a participant with one pilot taking top Suppression of Enemy Air Defenses (SEAD) pilot.

Former members of the 416th who have been hired by NASA to be astronauts include Mike Bloomfield, Duane Carey, Rex Walheim, Jim Dutton and Nick Hague.

Lineage
 416th Bombardment Squadron
 Constituted as the 26th Reconnaissance Squadron (Heavy) on 28 January 1942
 Redesignated 416th Bombardment Squadron (Heavy) on 22 April 1942
 Activated on 1 June 1942
 Redesignated 416th Bombardment Squadron, Heavy on 20 August 1943
 Inactivated on 8 November 1945
 Redesignated: 416th Bombardment Squadron, Very Heavy on 3 July 1947
 Activated in the reserve on 17 July 1947
 Inactivated on 27 June 1949
 Consolidated with the 6516th Test Squadron as the 6516th Test Squadron on 1 October 1992

 416th Test Squadron
 Designated as the 6516th Test Squadron and activated on 10 March 1989
 Consolidated with the 416th Bombardment Squadron on 1 October 1992
 Redesignated 416th Test Squadron on 2 October 1992

Assignments
 99th Bombardment Group, 1 June 1942 – 8 November 1945
 99th Bombardment Group, 17 July 1947 – 27 June 1949
 6510th Test Wing (later 412th Test Wing), 10 March 1989
 412th Operations Group, 1 October 1993 – present

Stations

 MacDill Field, Florida, 1 June 1942
 Pendleton Field, Oregon, 29 June 1942
 Gowen Field, Idaho, 28 August 1942
 Walla Walla Army Air Base, Washington, 30 September 1942
 Sioux City Army Air Base, Iowa, 17 November 1942 – 3 January 1943
 Navarin Airfield, Algeria, 25 March 1943

 Oudna Airfield, Tunisia, 5 August 1943
 Tortorella Airfield, Italy, 14 December 1943
 Marcianise Airfield, Italy, c. 27 October–8 November 1945
 Robins Field (later Robins Air Force Base), Georgia, 17 July 1947 – 27 June 1949
 Edwards Air Force Base, California, 10 March 1989 – present

Aircraft
 Boeing B-17 Flying Fortress, 1942–1945
 Boeing B-29 Superfortress, 1947-1949
 General Dynamics (Lockheed-Martin) F-16 Fighting Falcon, 1989–present
 McDonnell Douglas F-15A/B/C/D/E Eagle/Strike Eagle, 2004-2005

See also

 List of United States Air Force test squadrons
 Boeing B-17 Flying Fortress Units of the Mediterranean Theater of Operations

References
 Notes

 Notes

Bibliography

 
 
 

412
Military units and formations in California